In the fields of biochemistry and cell biology, the cation-dependent mannose-6-phosphate receptor (CD-MPR) also known as the 46 kDa mannose 6-phosphate receptor is a protein that in humans is encoded by the M6PR gene.

The CD-MPR is one of two transmembrane proteins that bind mannose-6-phosphate (M6P) tags on acid hydrolase precursors in the Golgi apparatus that are destined for transport to the lysosome. Homologues of CD-MPR are found in all eukaryotes.

Structure
The CD-MPR is a type I transmembrane protein (that is, it has a single transmembrane domain with its C-termini on the cytoplasmic side of lipid membranes) with a relatively short cytoplasmic tail. The extracytoplasmic/lumenal M6P binding-domain consists of 157 amino acid residues. The CD-MPR is approximately 46 kDa in size and it both exists and functions as a dimer.

The cell surface receptor for insulin-like growth factor 2 also functions as a cation-independent mannose 6-phosphate receptor. It consists of fifteen repeats homologous to the 157-residue CD-M6PR domain, two of which are responsible for binding to M6P.

Function
Both CD-MPRs and CI-MPRs are lectins that bind their M6P-tagged cargo in the lumen of the Golgi apparatus. The CD-MPR shows greatly enhanced binding to M6P in the presence of divalent cations, such as manganese. The MPRs (bound to their cargo) are recognized by the GGA family of clathrin adaptor proteins and accumulate in forming clathrin-coated vesicles. They are trafficked to the early endosome where, in the relatively low pH environment of the endosome, the MPRs release their cargo. The MPRs are recycled back to the Golgi, again by way of interaction with GGAs and vesicles. The cargo proteins are then trafficked to the lysosome via the late endosome independently of the MPRs.

See also 
 Mannose 6-phosphate receptor

References

Further reading

External links